Huntington-like neurodegenerative disorder 2 is a protein that in humans is encoded by the HDL3 gene.

References